Intermodal freight transport involves the transportation of freight in an intermodal container or vehicle, using multiple modes of transportation (e.g., rail, ship, aircraft, and truck), without any handling of the freight itself when changing modes. The method reduces cargo handling, and so improves security, reduces damage and loss, and allows freight to be transported faster. Reduced costs over road trucking is the key benefit for inter-continental use. This may be offset by reduced timings for road transport over shorter distances.

Origins

Intermodal transportation has its origin in 18th century England and predates the railways. Some of the earliest containers were those used for shipping coal on the Bridgewater Canal in England in the 1780s. Coal containers (called "loose boxes" or "tubs") were soon deployed on the early canals and railways and were used for road/rail transfers (road at the time meaning horse-drawn vehicles).

Wooden coal containers were first used on the railways in the 1830s on the Liverpool and Manchester Railway. In 1841, Isambard Kingdom Brunel introduced iron containers to move coal from the vale of Neath to Swansea Docks. By the outbreak of the First World War the Great Eastern Railway was using wooden containers to trans-ship passenger luggage between trains and sailings via the port of Harwich.

The early 1900s saw the first adoption of covered containers, primarily for the movement of furniture and intermodal freight between road and rail. A lack of standards limited the value of this service and this in turn drove standardisation. In the U.S. such containers, known as "lift vans", were in use from as early as 1911.

Intermodal container

Early containers

In the United Kingdom, containers were first standardised by the Railway Clearing House (RCH) in the 1920s, allowing both railway-owned and privately-owned vehicles to be carried on standard container flats. From 1928 the London, Midland & Scottish Railway offered "door to door" intermodal road-rail services using these containers. This standard failed to become popular outside the United Kingdom.

Pallets made their first major appearance during World War II, when the United States military assembled freight on pallets, allowing fast transfer between warehouses, trucks, trains, ships, and aircraft. Because no freight handling was required, fewer personnel were needed and loading times were decreased.

Truck trailers were first carried by railway before World War II, an arrangement often called "piggyback", by the small Class I railroad, the Chicago Great Western in 1936. The Canadian Pacific Railway was a pioneer in piggyback transport, becoming the first major North American railway to introduce the service in 1952. In the United Kingdom, the big four railway companies offered services using standard RCH containers that could be craned on and off the back of trucks. Moving companies such as Pickfords offered private services in the same way.

Containerization

In 1933 in Europe, under the auspices of the International Chamber of Commerce, The International Container Bureau (French: Bureau International des Conteneurs, BIC) was established. In June 1933, Bureau International des Containers et du Transport Intermodal (B.I.C.) decided about obligatory parameters for container use in international traffic. Containers handled by means of lifting gear, such as cranes, overhead conveyors, etc. for traveling elevators (group I containers), constructed after July 1, 1933. Obligatory Regulations:
 Clause 1 — Containers are, as regards form, either of the closed or the open type, and, as regards capacity, either of the heavy or the light type.
 Clause 2 — The loading capacity of containers must be such that their total weight (load, plus tare) is:  for containers of the heavy type;  for containers of the light type; a tolerance of 5 percent excess on the total weight is allowable under the same conditions as for wagon loads.

In April 1935, BIC established a second standard for European containers:

In the 1950s, a new standardized steel Intermodal container based on specifications from the United States Department of Defense began to revolutionize freight transportation. The International Organization for Standardization (ISO) then issued standards based upon the U.S. Department of Defense standards between 1968 and 1970.

The White Pass & Yukon Route railway acquired the world's first container ship, the Clifford J. Rogers, built in 1955, and introduced containers to its railway in 1956. In the United Kingdom the modernisation plan, and in turn the Beeching Report, strongly pushed containerization. The older wooden containers and the pre-ISO containers were rapidly replaced by  ISO standard containers, and later by  containers and larger.

In the U.S., starting in the 1960s, the use of containers increased steadily. Rail intermodal traffic tripled between 1980 and 2002, according to the Association of American Railroads (AAR), from 3.1 million trailers and containers to 9.3 million. Large investments were made in intermodal freight projects. An example was the US$740 million Port of Oakland intermodal rail facility begun in the late 1980s.

Since 1984, a mechanism for intermodal shipping known as double-stack rail transport has become increasingly common. Rising to the rate of nearly 70% of the United States' intermodal shipments, it transports more than one million containers per year. The double-stack rail cars design significantly reduces damage in transit and provides greater cargo security by cradling the lower containers so their doors cannot be opened. A succession of large, new, domestic container sizes was introduced to increase shipping productivity. In Europe, the more restricted loading gauge has limited the adoption of double-stack cars. However, in 2007 the Betuweroute, a railway from Rotterdam to the German industrial heartland, was completed, which may accommodate double-stacked containers in the future. Other countries, like New Zealand, have numerous low tunnels and bridges that limit expansion for economic reasons.

Since electrification generally predated double-stacking, the overhead wiring was too low to accommodate it.

Containers and container handling

Containers, also known as intermodal containers or ISO containers because the dimensions have been defined by ISO, are the main type of equipment used in intermodal transport, particularly when one of the modes of transportation is by ship. The three common sizes are:
one TEU –  × 
two TEU –  × 
highcube × .

In countries where the railway loading gauge is sufficient, truck trailers are often carried by rail. Variations exist, including open-topped versions covered by a fabric curtain are used to transport larger loads. A container called a tanktainer, with a tank inside a standard container frame, carries liquids. Refrigerated containers (reefer) are used for perishables. Swap body units have the same bottom corners as intermodal containers but are not strong enough to be stacked. They have folding legs under their frame and can be moved between trucks without using a crane.

Handling equipment can be designed with intermodality in mind, assisting with transferring containers between rail, road and sea. These can include:
container gantry crane for transferring containers from seagoing vessels onto either trucks or rail wagons. A spreader beam moves in several directions allowing accurate positioning of the cargo. A container crane is mounted on rails moving parallel to the ship's side, with a large boom spanning the distance between the ship's cargo hold and the quay.
Straddle carriers, and the larger rubber tyred gantry crane are able to straddle container stacks as well as rail and road vehicles, allowing for quick transfer of containers.
Grappler lift, which is very similar to a straddle carrier except it grips the bottom of a container rather than the top.
Reach stackers are fitted with lifting arms as well as spreader beams for lifting containers to truck or rail and can stack containers on top of each other.
Sidelifters are a road-going truck or semi-trailer with cranes fitted at each end to hoist and transport containers in small yards or over longer distances.
Forklift trucks in larger sizes are often used to load containers to/from truck and rail.
Flatbed trucks with special chain assemblies such as QuickLoadz can pull containers onto or off of the bed using the corner castings.

Load securing in intermodal containers

According to the European Commission Transportation Department “it has been estimated that up to 25% of accidents involving trucks can be attributable to inadequate cargo securing”. Cargo that is improperly secured can cause severe accidents and lead to the loss of cargo, the loss of lives, the loss of vehicles, ships and airplane; not to mention the environmental hazards it can cause.
There are many different ways and materials available to stabilize and secure cargo in containers used in the various modes of transportation. Conventional Load Securing methods and materials such as steel banding and wood blocking & bracing have been around for decades and are still widely used. In the last few years the use of several, relatively new and unknown Load Securing methods have become available through innovation and technological advancement including polyester strapping and -lashing, synthetic webbings and Dunnage Bags, also known as air bags.

Transportation modes

Container ships

Container ships are used to transport containers by sea. These vessels are custom-built to hold containers. Some vessels can hold thousands of containers. Their capacity is often measured in TEU or FEU. These initials stand for "twenty-foot equivalent unit," and "forty-foot equivalent unit," respectively.

On board ships they are typically stacked up to seven units high.

A key consideration in the size of container ships is that larger ships exceed the capacity of important sea routes such as the Panama and Suez canals.

Very large container ships also require specialized deep water terminals and handling facilities. The container fleet available, route constraints, and terminal capacity play a large role in shaping global container shipment logistics.

Railways

  

In North America, containers are often shipped by rail in container well cars. These cars resemble flatcars but the newer ones have a container-sized depression, or well, in the middle (between the bogies or "trucks") of the car. This depression allows for sufficient clearance to allow two containers to be loaded in the car in a "double stack" arrangement. The newer container cars also are specifically built as a small articulated "unit", most commonly in components of three or five, whereby two components are connected by a single bogie as opposed to two bogies, one on each car. Double stacking is also used in parts of Australia. On some older railways, particularly in the United Kingdom, the use of well cars is necessary to carry single stacked large containers within the loading gauge.

It is also common in North America to transport semi-trailers on railway flatcars or spine cars, an arrangement called "piggyback" or TOFC (trailer on flatcar) to distinguish it from container on flatcar (COFC). Some flatcars are designed with collapsible trailer hitches so they can be used for trailer or container service. Such designs allow trailers to be rolled on from one end, though lifting trailers on and off flatcars by specialized loaders is more common. TOFC terminals typically have large areas for storing trailers pending loading or pickup.

If the rail line has been built with sufficient vertical clearance then double-stack rail transport can be used. Where lines are electrified with overhead electric wiring double stacking is normally not possible. The mandatory requirement to fit under overhead wire for the traction engine electrical power supply sets the height limit for the railcars to allow for trailer transport. This requires a certain low building height which led to a minor size of wheels for the railcars. Hence increased degradation of bogeys by wheel wear-out is a cost disadvantage for the system.

When carried by rail, containers can be loaded on flatcars or in container well cars. In Europe, stricter railway height restrictions (smaller loading gauge and structure gauge) and overhead electrification prevent containers from being stacked two high, and containers are hauled one high either on standard flatcars or other railroad cars. Taller containers are often carried in well wagons (not stacked) on older European railway routes where the loading gauge (especially with the reduced gauge for UK lines) is particularly small.

Wider narrow gauge railways of e.g.  and  gauge can take ISO containers, provided that the loading gauge allows it.

Trucks 

Trucking is frequently used to connect the "linehaul" ocean and rail segments of a global intermodal freight movement. This specialized trucking that runs between ocean ports, rail terminals, and inland shipping docks, is often called drayage, and is typically provided by dedicated drayage companies or by the railroads.
As many rail lines in the United States terminate in or around Chicago, Illinois, the area serves as a common relay point for containerized freight moving across the country. Many of the motor carriers call this type of drayage “crosstown loads” that originate at one rail road and terminate at another.  For example, a container destined for the east coast from the west will arrive in Chicago either via the Union Pacific or BNSF Railway and have to be relayed to one of the eastern railroads, either CSX or Norfolk Southern.

Barges

Barges utilising ro-ro and container-stacking techniques transport freight on large inland waterways such as the Rhine/Danube in Europe and the Mississippi River in the U.S.

Land bridges
The term landbridge or land bridge is commonly used in the intermodal freight transport sector. When a containerized ocean freight shipment travels across a large body of land for a significant distance, that portion of the trip is referred to as the "land bridge" and the mode of transport used is rail transport. There are three applications for the term.
 Land bridge – An intermodal container shipped by ocean vessel crosses an entire body of land/country/continent before being reloaded on a cargo ship. For example, a container shipment from China to Germany is loaded onto a ship in China, unloads at a Los Angeles port, travels via rail transport to a New York/New Jersey port, and loads on a ship for Hamburg. Also see Eurasian Land Bridge.
 Mini land bridge – An intermodal container shipped by ocean vessel from country A to country B passes across a large portion of land in either country A or B. For example, a container shipment from China to New York is loaded onto a ship in China, unloads at a Los Angeles port and travels via rail transport to New York, the final destination.
 Micro land bridge – An intermodal container shipped by ocean vessel from country A to country B passes across a large portion of land to reach an interior inland destination. For example, a container shipment from China to Denver, Colorado, is loaded onto a ship in China, unloads at a Los Angeles port and travels via rail transport to Denver, the final destination.

The term reverse land bridge refers to a micro land bridge from an east coast port (as opposed to a west coast port in the previous examples) to an inland destination.

Planes 

Generally modern, bigger planes usually carry cargo in the containers. Sometimes even the checked luggage is first placed into containers, and then loaded onto the plane. Of course because of the requirement for the lowest weight possible (and very important, little difference in the viable mass point), and low space, specially designed containers made from lightweight material are often used. Due to price and size, this is rarely seen on the roads or in ports. However, large transport aircraft make it possible to even load standard container(s), or use standard sized containers made of much lighter materials like titanium or aluminium.

Biggest shipping liner companies by TEU capacity

Gallery

See also 

 Combined transport
 Co-modality (by the European Commission)
 Container numbering
 Containerization
 CargoBeamer
 Customs Convention on Containers
 Dunnage Bags
 Double-stack car
 Dry port
 Haulage
 Inland port
 Intermodal container
 Intermodal flatcars
 Konkan Railway Corporation
 Less-Than-Truckload (LTL) Shipping
 Load securing
 Merchant ship
 Modalohr
 Piggy-back
 Roadrailer
 Rolling highway
 Shipping
 Sidelifter
 Swap body
 Tanktainer
 Transloading
 Top intermodal container companies list
 Well car

References

Bibliography

 European Intermodal Association (2005). Intermodal Transport in Europe. EIA, Brussels. 

 Sidney, Samuel  (1846). Gauge Evidence: The History and Prospects of the Railway System. Edmonds, London, UK. No ISBN.

External links

 IANA: The Intermodal Association of North America
 
World Transportation Organization The world transportation organization (The Non-Profit Advisory Organization)

Freight transport
Intermodal transport